The IJmuiden sea lock (Dutch: zeesluis IJmuiden) is the second largest lock in the world.
The lock, situated in the municipality of Velsen, was opened on 26 January 2022 in the presence of King Willem-Alexander of the Netherlands.

References

Transport in North Holland
Locks of the Netherlands